Albert Pallavicini was the fifth marquess of Bodonitsa from his father's death until his own in 1311. His father was Thomas, a great-nephew of the first marquess, Guy. Albert married Maria dalle Carceri, a Venetian noblewoman from Euboea. He even obtained a sixth of that island.

He was a loyal vassal of the princes of Achaea. In 1305, he was summoned by his lord Philip of Savoy to a tournament and parliament on the Isthmus of Corinth. In 1307, he obeyed the similar summons of Philip I of Taranto. On 15 March 1311, he followed Walter V of Brienne into the Battle of the Cephissus, but did not emerge alive. By the Assizes of Romania, his fief was inherited by his widow and his daughter, Guglielma.

Sources
 
 

13th-century births
1311 deaths
14th-century rulers in Europe
14th-century Italian nobility
Christians of the Crusades
Military personnel killed in action
Albert
Albert
Triarchs of Negroponte
Year of birth unknown